Rebecca Swan (born January 19, 1970) is an American filmmaker and screenwriter known for working in the horror genre.

Biography  
Rebecca Swan (previously Scott Swan) was born in Pittsburgh, Pennsylvania, in 1970.  She is the first transgender screenwriter of a produced theatrical horror movie.  She is the co-screenwriter of director John Carpenter's two Masters of Horror episodes: Cigarette Burns and Pro-Life. These episodes were produced as part of the Masters series for Showtime.  When the anthology series moved to NBC in 2008, she cowrote "Skin & Bones", an episode for the retitled show Fear Itself. 

Swan's most recent work is the 2018 horror movie Extremity. Shot in the City of Edmonton in Alberta, Canada in 2017, Swan co-wrote the screenplay, served as associate producer and second unit director, and also appears in the movie briefly.

Filmography as writer
Cigarette Burns (2005)
Pro-Life (2006)
Skin & Bones (2008)
The Profane Exhibit (2013)
Extremity (2018)
The Final Interview (2018)

Theatre as writer
Sticks & Stones (1994)
Broken Bones (1995)

References

External links

Screenwriters from Pennsylvania
American dramatists and playwrights
Living people
Writers from Pittsburgh
1970 births